Pterostylis pedina is a plant in the orchid family Orchidaceae and is endemic to New South Wales where in grows on the south-west plains. It was first formally described in 2009 by David Jones and given the name Oligochaetochilus pedinus. The description was published in the journal The Orchadian from a specimen grown in Yass from a material collected near Hay. In 2010, Jasmine Janes and Marco Duretto changed the name to Pterostylis pedina. The specific epithet (pedina) is derived from the Ancient Greek word pedinos meaning "flat" or "level".

References

pedina
Orchids of New South Wales
Plants described in 2010
Taxa named by Marco Duretto
Taxa named by David L. Jones (botanist)